Ballon is a commune in the Charente-Maritime department, region of Nouvelle-Aquitaine, southwestern France.

The inhabitants of the commune are known as Ballonais or Ballonaises.

Geography
Ballon is located some 12 km north of Rochefort and 6 km south of Aigrefeuille-d'Aunis. Access to the commune is by the D111 road from Thairé in the west which passes through the village and continues to Ciré-d'Aunis in the east. The D266 goes south-west from the village then west to join the D110 west of the commune. The commune is entirely farmland.

The Canal de Charras forms the south-eastern border of the commune with the Canal des Roseaux joining it on the southern border and forming part of the south western border. In most of the commune - especially the south - there is an extensive network of canals including the Canal de Ceinture du Marais de Moullepieds and the Canal de Lileau.

Neighbouring communes and villages

Administration

List of Successive Mayors

Demography
In 2017 the commune had 795 inhabitants.

Distribution of Age Groups
The population of the town is younger than the departmental average.

Percentage Distribution of Age Groups in Ballon and Charente-Maritime Department in 2017

Source: INSEE

See also
Communes of the Charente-Maritime department

References

External links
Ballon on Géoportail, National Geographic Institute (IGN) website 
Ballon on the 1750 Cassini Map

Communes of Charente-Maritime